The Way I Am may refer to:

Music

Albums 
 The Way I Am (Ana Johnsson album), or the title song (see below)
 The Way I Am (Billy Preston album), or the title song
 The Way I Am (Colton Ford album)
 The Way I Am (Dino album), 1993
 The Way I Am (Jennifer Knapp album), or the title song
 The Way I Am (Knoc-turn'al album), or the title song
 The Way I Am (MC Mong album), or the title song
 The Way I Am (Merle Haggard album), or the title song (see below)
 The Way I Am, an album by Patti Dahlstrom

Songs 
 "The Way I Am" (Charlie Puth song), 2018
 "The Way I Am" (Eminem song), 2000
 "The Way I Am" (Ingrid Michaelson song), 2006
 "The Way I Am" (Merle Haggard song), 1980
 "The Way I Am" (Neil Sedaka song)
 "The Way I Am" (Sandra song), 2006
 "The Way I Am", a song by Ana Johnsson from Cuz I Can
 "The Way I Am", a song by Staind from The Illusion of Progress
 "The Way I Am", a song by Status Quo from Perfect Remedy

Literature 
 The Way I Am (book), a 2008 autobiography by Eminem

See also 
 "The Way I Are", a 2007 song by Timbaland
 The Way That I Am, a 1993 album by Martina McBride
 Just the Way I Am, an album by Dolly Parton